ProGuard is an open source command-line tool that shrinks, optimizes and obfuscates Java code. It is able to optimize bytecode as well as detect and remove unused instructions. ProGuard is free software and is distributed under the GNU General Public License, version 2.

ProGuard was distributed as part of the Android SDK and ran when building the application in release mode.

Features 

 Bytecode-level optimizations;
 Works with Java Micro Edition and Android;

Obfuscation 

ProGuard obfuscates Java and Android programs by renaming classes, fields, and methods using meaningless names, making it harder to reverse-engineer the final application.

Optimization 

Besides removing unused instructions from the compiled bytecode, ProGuard optimizes it using techniques such as control flow analysis, data-flow analysis, partial evaluation, static single assignment, global value numbering, and liveness analysis.

ProGuard can remove many types of unused and duplicated code, perform over 200 peephole optimizations, reduce variable allocation, inline constant and short methods, simplify tail recursion calls, remove logging code, among others.

See also 

 Java (programming language)
 Program optimization
 Obfuscation (software)
 Dotfuscator
 DashO (software)

References

Software obfuscation
Free software programmed in Java (programming language)